Peng Yigang (3 September 1932 – 23 October 2022) was a Chinese architect, and an academician of the Chinese Academy of Sciences.

He was a member of the 10th Central Committee of the China Democratic League. He was a member of the 8th and 9th National Committee of the Chinese People's Political Consultative Conference.

Biography
Peng was born in Hefei, Anhui, on 3 September 1932. His family relocated to Lihuang County (now Jinzhai County) due to the Second Sino-Japanese War, where he attended Gaoqi Primary School and the Private Zhongzheng Middle School. After graduating from Hefei High School in 1950, he was admitted to Tangshan Institute of Technology, Northern Jiaotong University (now Southwest Jiaotong University). During the national reorganization of colleges and departments in the year 1952, he became a student of Beijing Railway College (now Beijing Jiaotong University) and then Tianjin University.

After university in 1953, Peng taught at Tianjin University, where he was promoted to full professor in 1983 and to doctoral supervisor in 1986. He joined the China Democratic League in November 1987.

On 23 October 2022, he died from an illness in Tianjin, at the age of 90.

Architectures
The main buildings designed by Peng include the Architecture Hall of Tianjin University, Wang Xuezhong Art Research Institute, Tianjin Water Park Panda House, Pingdu Park, Liugong Island Memorial Hall, and London Chinatown.

Publications

Honours and awards
 October 1995 Member of the Chinese Academy of Sciences (CAS)

References

1932 births
2022 deaths
People from Hefei
Chinese architects
Members of the Chinese Academy of Sciences
Members of the 8th Chinese People's Political Consultative Conference
Members of the 9th Chinese People's Political Consultative Conference